Federal Highway 83 (Carretera Federal 83) is a Federal Highway of Mexico. The highway travels from its northern junction with Mexican Federal Highway 85 (25.2 km / 15.7 mi north of Ciudad Victoria) to Ignacio Zaragoza, Tamaulipas to the south at the junction with Mexican Federal Highway 81.

References

083
Transportation in Tamaulipas